Paulo Henrique Taicher (born 4 June 1977) is a former professional tennis player from Brazil.

Taicher, who comes from Novo Hamburgo, is most noted for his performance at the 1999 Pan American Games in Winnipeg, where he won two medals. He partnered with André Sá to win the men's doubles gold and was a bronze medalist in the singles.

Challenger titles

Doubles: (1)

References

External links
 
 

1977 births
Living people
Brazilian male tennis players
Tennis players at the 1999 Pan American Games
Pan American Games gold medalists for Brazil
Pan American Games bronze medalists for Brazil
Pan American Games medalists in tennis
Medalists at the 1999 Pan American Games
Sportspeople from Rio Grande do Sul
21st-century Brazilian people
20th-century Brazilian people